{{DISPLAYTITLE:C7H8O3}}
The molecular formula C7H8O3 (molar mass: 140.14 g/mol, exact mass: 140.0473 u) may refer to:

 Ethyl maltol
 Methoxymethylfurfural (MMF or 5-methoxymethylfuran-2-carbaldehyde)

Molecular formulas